Sigonce is a commune in the Alpes-de-Haute-Provence department in southeastern France.

Economy

Sisteron lamb
Sisteron lamb is native of the departments of Alpes-de-Haute-Provence and Drôme. Derived from traditional farms, the parent breeds being the Merino d'Arles and the Southern Alps Mourerous, they are kept on their mothers for at least two months in pastures of at least ten hectares, and stocked at fewer than 10 sheep per hectare. These lambs are registered under the Institut national de l’origine et de la qualité (INAO). The associated regulations end the practice of raising stock in the same conditions but from multiple regions, including all of Provence, the Massif Central, and the Piedmont.

Population

History 
Some discoveries attest to an active state of this town dating to prehistoric and Roman eras.

Antiquity 
In ancient times the territory of Sigonce was part of the Sogiontiques, whose territory extends south of the Baronnies à la Durance. The Sogiontiques are federated to Voconces and after the Roman conquest, they were attached with them in the Roman province of Narbonne. In the second century, they were detached from Voconces and formed a separate civitas, with its capital 'Segustero' (Sisteron).

Middle Ages 
While the southeast of Gaul was a land Burgundian under King of the Ostrogoths, Theodoric the Great conquered the region between Durance, Rhone and Isere in 510. The town briefly depended once more on Italy until 526. To reconcile with the Burgundian king, Gondemar III, the regent Ostrogothic Amalasuntha gave him the territory.
The town of Sigonce was, for the first time, in charters in 1206. It was then a hunting reserve list of the counts of Forcalquier, which was given to the Ganagobie Priory. The feud is therefore within the Abbey of Cluny through Ganagobie.
The Aris community ('Arises'') reported began as early as 960, when its territory was given to the Abbey of Ganagobie, which counted 21 villages in 1315, but was heavily depopulated by the crises of the fourteenth century (Black Death and the Hundred Years' War) and annexed by that of Sigonce in the fifteenth century. The community was under the magistrature of Forcalquier.

French Revolution 
During the French Revolution, the town developed a political scene, created after the end of 1792.

Since the Revolution 
The coup of December 2, 1851 by Napoleon III committed against the Second Republic of France provoked an armed uprising in the Basses-Alpes, in defense of the French Constitution of 1848. After the failure of the uprising, severe repression continued for those who stood up to defend the Republic: new inhabitants of Sigonce were brought before the Joint Committee, the most common punishment of deportation to Algeria.
Like many municipalities in the department, Sigonce had a school well before the Jules Ferry laws: in 1863, they already had a primary education that provides boys, the chief town. The same instruction was given to girls, although the Falloux law (1851), which required the opening of a girls' school in municipalities had more than 800 unsupported inhabitants., (p)  The town benefits from the subsidies of the second Duruy Act (1877) to build a new school.

See also
Communes of the Alpes-de-Haute-Provence department

References

Communes of Alpes-de-Haute-Provence
Alpes-de-Haute-Provence communes articles needing translation from French Wikipedia